Gambasca is a comune (municipality) in the Province of Cuneo in the Italian region Piedmont, located about  southwest of Turin and about  northwest of Cuneo.

Gambasca borders the following municipalities: Brossasco, Martiniana Po, Revello, Rifreddo, and Sanfront.

References 

Cities and towns in Piedmont